Arisba or Arisbe (Eth. Ἀρισβαἰος), was a town of Mysia, mentioned by Homer in the same line with Sestos and Abydus. It was between Percote and Abydus, a colony of Mytilene, founded by Scamandrius and Ascanius, son of Aeneas. It was a member of the Delian League.

The army of Alexander the Great mustered here after crossing the Hellespont. When the wandering Gauls passed over into Asia, on the invitation of Attalus I, they occupied Arisba, but were soon defeated, in 216 BCE, by Prusias I of Bithynia. In Strabo's time the place was almost forgotten.

There are coins of Arisbe from the Roman emperor Trajan's time (early 2nd century), and also autonomous coins.

Its site is tentatively located at Musakoy in Asiatic Turkey.

References

Ancient Greek archaeological sites in Turkey
Former populated places in Turkey
Greek colonies in Mysia
Milesian colonies
Cities in ancient Troad
Populated places in ancient Mysia
Locations in the Iliad
Members of the Delian League